Heightened Senses is an online story written by Sharat Chinnapa. It was started on May 6, 2012. It is a dystopian and borderline science fiction story set approximately 30 years into the future. The story is updated every Tuesday and Saturday.

In this alternate future, genetic experimentation has caused an infectious genetic mutation known as "Gene-X" to run rampant.

Gene-X mutations
A Gene-X mutation, caused by the virus Hithalmia Azitas, is a highly infectious condition that causes the afflicted to react to a single certain "trigger". The reaction to this trigger often results in a heightening of the senses of the afflicted - a condition known as a "Heightening".
Most of the main characters in Heightened Senses are infected, and have Heightenings.

Setting and backstory
Gene-X went viral thirty years ago and the world went out of control. There were massacres of infected people and those who wanted to escape the infection built settlements called "Stations" that were completely cut off from the outside world.
The population of the world dropped drastically and people regressed to a life with very limited resources. Outside the Stations, people grouped together under powerful leaders in order to survive. And an organisation called the Country was formed. The origins of the Country are uncertain, but they are the primary organisation that battles the Stations in the vicinity of the story.

Plot summary
The plot begins in a city now called Haven. The old name of the city is forgotten. The primarily follows two characters, Lance and Reide. They are fighters for hire in the city of Haven, where they accept jobs for payment in cash or kind to keep themselves supplied. An informant, Terrai Hanswitch, approaches them with a case regarding a missing child - and they accept.
The case leads them to the doorstep of the one who is effectively rules the city, Shadow.
Shadow has, in fact, constructed this case to bring Lance and Reide to him - and make them an offer. A third party, Erin Iyelsviel - the Ace of Diamonds (see rankings in the Country) - joins their meeting, and things turn hostile. Eventually, Shadow makes his proposition, after Erin leaves. He wants the pair to infiltrate the Country and bring back information regarding research the Country is doing on multiple Heightenings. He reveals that this boy he has kidnapped, Jared - the one Lance and Reide are supposed to recover - is an example of a person with two Heightenings.

Lance and Reide decide to accept the offer - despite the danger involved in dealing with the Country. They return to their base of operations and are met by the Jack of Clubs, Jay, who identifies herself as a double agent who is reporting to Shadow from the Country. They leave with her to the Country's base and are welcomed into the House of Clubs. Inside, Reide is taken to meet the King of Clubs, Cloud - while Lance is dismissed to a room upstairs. Inside, he is met by the Queen of Clubs, Eleanor. Cloud offers to teach Reide to "transcend" on the condition that he joins the Country, and Reide accepts. Meanwhile Eleanor makes a similar proposition to Lance - she suggests that since they have very similar abilities, they might be able to learn each other's - proving that Heightenings are not as limited as they are believed to be, he accepts as well and they begin "practice" immediately.

Terrai Hanswitch attempts to sneak into the Spire - Shadow's stronghold - and spy on a meeting between the top executives in Shadows organisation. She manages to get in, but is caught. However, Jared pleads for her life and Shadow decides not to kill her. Instead, both Jared and Terrai are sent on a mission to a Station identified as Station "Aris".

The next day, Lance is accosted by some members of the House of Clubs and is forced to defend himself. The fight is interrupted by Jay, the Jack, who declares that Lance be put in solitary confinement (for a week) for his actions. She escorts him out, and explains that this is a ruse to give him greater freedom of movement in the Country. His task is now to infiltrate the other Houses (of Spades, Diamonds, and Hearts) in turn and fulfill Shadow's assignment. Meanwhile, Reide begins his training with Cloud - and is kept apart from Lance. He believes his friend to be in solitary confinement.

Jay leaves Lance at the house of Spades where over a few days he befriends the Three of Spades, Flair, and steals one of her access cards. With these he is granted access to the computers and he finds information he believes Shadow might be interested in - and transfers it onto a drive that Jay gave him. He then leaves the House of Spades and goes to the House of Diamonds. 

Six days into his week of solitary confinement, Lance incapacitates the Four of Diamonds and takes his access card - attempting to use the same trick he used at Spades. But while attempting to steal data from the House of Diamonds, he sets of an alarm. Before he can escape, he is confronted again by Erin Iylesviel and captured - but during the battle, he catches a glimpse of Jay leaving the facility.

Within Station Aris, an order is given for people to be sent out of the Station to capture "specimens" from the outside to test the effectiveness of a drug that the Stations have developed to Counter Gene-X.

In the Country, a meeting of the royalty is called - and Cloud finds that Eleanor has disappeared. He takes Reide along instead. At the meeting, the possibility of the Stations mobilizing again is discussed. And at the end, Erin Iyelsviel announces that an intruder was caught in Diamonds - Lance. The punishment decided for him is death. Meanwhile, Eleanor breaks into the House of Diamonds and rescues Lance and they attempt to escape the facility.
(Plot has gone this far as of Match 33–30 August)

The Country
The Country is an organisation formed approximately 30 years prior to the start of the story. Their primary objective is to combat the Stations - and prevent them from massacring people from the Outside as was done 30 years ago. The Country is divided into four Houses - the House of Spades, Hearts, Diamonds and Clubs. The Country is composed of "members" and "card holders" - the former are mostly soldiers or scientists.

Card Holders

The Country's equivalent of an "officer" is a card holder. They rank Two through Ace and increase in seniority and power from Two through Jack. The King and Queen seem to have an approximately equal relationship as decisions are taken by both parties. (Note: There is no indication that the King and Queen are married - it's just a rank) Very little is known, at this point, about the Aces. The Ace of Diamonds seems to be a somewhat autonomous entity but has never taken a decision that affected the entire House.

Types of Heightenings
Commonly, there are three distinct types of Heightenings, Transformative, Amplificatory, and Hypnotic. There is also mention of a fourth type, the Transcendental Heightening.
 Transformative — Heightenings involve the users body being physically modified.
 Amplificatory — Heightenings cause a certain sense or ability of a normal person to be dramatically increased.
 Hypnotic — Heightenings involve some kind of hypnosis - where the user can influence the mind of another person, or in some cases himself.
 Transcendental — Heightenings, are of two types. First, where it is innate - the person is born with this, and it involves the ability to affect the physical world with the mind. The second is the acquired type - where a normal Heightening is improved so much that it results in an almost godlike ability.

Characters

Lance Kelyrta

Also known as: The Ignitor
Age: 19
Height: 172 cm
Trigger: Proximity to fire.
Heightening: (Hypnotic) The ability to transfer select thoughts with a person for as long as he is near the fire.

Background: Lance grew up in a small town many miles from the city of Haven. He was an only child. The town was closely knit - as such places are - but supplies are scarce. The only have what they can produce themselves. Lance (and Reide) both left to seek their futures elsewhere - three years before the start of the story. They still occasionally return and leave some of their profits behind.

Lance has a very high tolerance of pain. He sometimes practices his heightening on himself. However, despite his famous reputation as the demonic Ignitor, he only kills when he is forced to.

Reide

Last name is currently unknown. 
Also known as: The Viper
Age: 23
Height: 180 cm
Trigger: Repetition of a sequence of notes. (exact notes will be added)
Heightening: (Amplificatory) Dramatically heightened brain assimilation. Results in faster judgement and reaction time. Average (heightened) reaction time: 0.06 seconds.

Background: Reide and Lance come from the same town, and have known each other almost all their lives. Reide is practical and situation oriented. It was his idea to leave the village and work for hire in Haven, in order to be less of a burden to the town that was his home. He proposed the idea to Lance, who agreed.

Terrai Hanswitch

Age: 22
Height: 167 cm
Trigger: Skin contact with iron. (exact notes will be added)
Heightening: (Amplificatory) The ability to repel attention. Implies that people are highly likely to not notice her presence.

Shadow

Age: 15
Height: 172 cm
Trigger: Unknown
Heightening: Unknown
Background: Very little is actually known about the one called Shadow. He rose to prominence in haven four years before the start of the story, when he was merely an eleven-year-old boy. He was quickly surrounded by strong people, who often acted on his behalf. Slowly, his power began to consolidate in the unnamed gang, that is known only as 'Shadow's folk'. He has a reputation for not being seen - or leaving dead those he has encountered, perhaps this is the reason for his name. The truth of his heightening and trigger is obscure, because most who have seen it are dead.

Erin Iylesviel

Also known as: The Ace of Diamonds 
Age: 22
Height: 167 cm
Trigger: Unknown
Heightening: It is likely to be the production of electricity in his body. 
Background: Erin is a powerful member of the Country. In the organisation, he is something of a lone wolf, with his own agenda. He seems to have a good intelligence network, as he is often quickly informed of things, but this network has never been discovered.

Jay

Also known as: The Jack of Clubs 
Age: 25
Height: 156 cm
Trigger: Unknown
Heightening: Unknown
Background: Jay is the Jack of Clubs - she plays the dangerous role of Shadow's contact in the Country and she cannot afford to be found out. She brings Lance and Reide to the Country as Shadow's agents - but there are other reasons too.

Cloud

Also known as: The King of Clubs
Age: 27
Height: 183 cm
Trigger: Unknown
Heightening: Telekinesis
Background: The awe inspiring and charismatic King of Clubs is the youngest of the four Kings. It is said that he has never even been touched in a battle. He joined the Country as a Jack - the first and only person to ever be made a senior member upon joining. When the previous King was killed in the raids by Stations eight years ago Cloud took his place not only by the old king's command, but along with a unanimous vote in his favour. All of the Clubs are fervently loyal and will do anything he says - except, perhaps, one person?

Eleanor

Also known as: The Queen of Clubs
Age: 26
Height: 170 cm
Trigger: Absence of sunlight
Heightening: The ability to transfer thoughts from another person to herself. 
Background: Eleanor was the Country's youngest member - both her parents were of the Country so she was born and raised within it. With both of them among the dead in the Station's raids eight years ago she was left alone and rose quickly up the ranks. While her ability is not an offensive one, she is able to use it to predict a person's movements making exceedingly difficult to match in combat.

Ray Steele

Age: 41
Height: 179 cm
Trigger: none 
Heightening: none 
Background: Ray Steele was eleven years old when he became part of Station Aris - just as the conflict was beginning. His father was a rich businessman who died when Steele was in his late twenties. That year, Steele joined the Aris defence force. He was a late entrant, but rose up the ranks quickly. In his early thirties he played a vital role in the most crippling strike the Stations ever made on the Country. Acclaimed for his strategic improvisations in that battle, eight years prior to today, he became a candidate for the post of the Captain of the Aris Defence Force. He finally rose to this position when he was 35 and has led the Force competently since then. He is also an excellent shot with a variety of weapons.

References

External links
 https://web.archive.org/web/20131022183017/http://heightenedsensesstory.com/

Science fiction books